The Battle of Mendigorría Grand was a battle of the First Carlist War.  It occurred on July 16, 1835 south of Mendigorría, Navarre.  The Carlists were commanded by Vicente González Moreno, who assumed this post after the death of Zumalacárregui at the Siege of Bilbao.  The Carlist pretender Don Carlos was also at Mendigorría.

When the Liberals attacked, the Carlists found themselves in a difficult strategic position: they had the Arga River behind them and only one way across, the Bridge of Larraga.

The Liberal left flank was led by Baldomero Espartero, the central flank by Luis Fernández de Córdova.

The Carlist fiercely defended themselves but were forced to retreat.  Don Carlos was able to escape thanks to the efforts of the defense of the Larraga bridge by the Carlist brigadier Bruno Villareal.

The battle was a Liberal victory, though the Liberals did not press forward and take advantage of the situation.

External links
MENDIGORRIA. 1835-VII-16

Mendigorría
Mendigorría
Mendigorría
July 1835 events